The 2017 mayoral recall election in Flint, Michigan was held on November 7, 2017, and resulted in incumbent mayor Karen Weaver being re-elected.

Background
Karen Weaver, the first woman to serve as mayor of Flint, Michigan, took office in 2015 during the Flint water crisis, which remained a central issue in 2017.

In August 2017 petitioners gathered sufficient signatures for a recall election. The recall election was a single election, rather than a two-stage process in which an initial decision on whether to recall Weaver would be followed by another election for a new mayor if necessary.

The recall election followed a controversy relating to Weaver's support for a waste collection contract with Rizzo Environmental Services, a company involved in a corruption scandal that led to criminal charges against 17 people. The election also occurred amidst disagreement between Weaver and the City Council over the city's water provision.

Campaign
Weaver argued that the recall was motivated by racism and sexism. Her opponents criticized her for failing to work with the City Council and eroding public faith in government.

In August 2017, Weaver filed a complaint that sought to cancel the recall election, alleging illegal behavior by those circulating the recall petition. The civil suit was dismissed later that month.

Candidates
Eighteen candidates contested the election:
 David Davenport, business owner
 Chris Del Morone, retired
 Wood Etherly, Jr., City Council member
 Anderson L. Fernanders, attorney
 Ray Hall
 Ronald D. Higgerson, artist
 Brent Allan Jaworski, union steward
 Ellery Johnson, phlebotomist
 Scott Kincaid, City Council member
 Sean Macintyre, activist
 David Meier, retired tradesman
 Anthony Palladeno Jr.
 Don Pfeiffer, self-employed
 Jeffrey L. Shelley
 Al Wamsley, pastor
 Angela Ward, entrepreneur
 Karen Weaver, incumbent mayor
 Arthur Woodson, veterans' rights advocate

Results
Flint mayoral recall election, November 7, 2017
Karen Weaver – 7,709 (52.98%)
Scott Kincaid – 4,671 (32.10%)
Don Pfeiffer – 894 (6.14%)
Arthur Woodson – 352 (2.42%)
Anthony Palladeno Jr. – 167 (1.15%)
David Davenport – 141 (0.97%)
Angela Ward – 113 (0.78%)
Woody Etherly, Jr. – 95 (0.65%)
Jeffrey L. Shelley – 50 (0.34%)
Sean Macintyre – 48 (0.33%)
Chris Del Morone – 45 (0.31%)
Brent Allan Jaworski – 29 (0.20%)
Ronald D. Higgerson – 25 (0.17%)
Ellery Johnson – 25 (0.17%)
Anderson L. Fernanders – 18 (0.12%)
Al Wamsley – 18 (0.12%)
David Meier – 16 (0.11%)
Ray Hall – 10 (0.07%)

See also
 2017 United States elections
 List of mayors of Flint, Michigan

References

Flint
Flint mayoral
Local elections in Michigan
Flint, Michigan
Flint 2017
Flint